Fridays is a sketch comedy and variety show that aired on the American Broadcasting Company for three seasons from April 11, 1980 to April 23, 1982.

Series overview

Episodes

Season 1 (1980)

Season 2 (1980–81)

Season 3 (1981–82)

References

External links
 

Fridays
Fridays